Andrew Cecil Wolfson (1 May 1890 – 26 July 1978) was an English first-class cricketer.

Wolfson was the son of the Russian-born Henry Wolfson, who emigrated to England before making a fortune cultivating potatoes and tomatoes in the Canary Islands. He was educated in England at Marlborough College. He later made two appearances in first-class cricket for H. D. G. Leveson Gower's XI in 1920, against Cambridge University and Oxford University at Eastbourne. He scored 14 runs in his two matches, as well as taking 2 wickets with his right-arm medium pace. Wolfson died in July 1978 at Forest Row, Sussex.

References

External links

1890 births
1978 deaths
English people of Russian descent
Sportspeople from Santa Cruz de Tenerife
People educated at Marlborough College
English cricketers
H. D. G. Leveson Gower's XI cricketers
People from Forest Row